Pope Dionysius (died 268) was a Greek pope.

Saint Dionysius may also refer to:

 Saint Dionysius of Alexandria (died 265), Bishop of Alexandria
 Saint Dionysius of Paris (died c. 250), Christian martyr
 Saint Dionysius the Areopagite (1st century), judge of the Areopagus
 Geevarghese  Dionysius of Vattasseril or Saint Dionysius of India (died 1934), Primate of the Indian Orthodox Church

See also
 Agios Dionyssios (disambiguation)
 Dennis (disambiguation)
 Dionysos (disambiguation)
 Saint Denis (disambiguation)
 San Dionisio (disambiguation)